JazzFest Berlin (also known as the Berlin Jazz Festival) is a jazz festival in Berlin, Germany.  Originally called the "Berliner Jazztage" (Berlin Jazz Days), it was founded in 1964 in West Berlin by the Berliner Festspiele.  Venues included Berliner Philharmonie, Haus der Kulturen der Welt, Volksbühne, Haus der Berliner Festspiele and the Jazzclubs Quasimodo and A-Trane.

The festival's mission has been "to document, support, and validate trends in jazz, and to mirror the diversity of creative musical activity.

See also

List of music festivals
List of jazz festivals

References

External links
Official site

Jazz festivals in Germany
Music festivals established in 1964
Music festivals in Berlin
Music in Berlin
Recurring events established in 1964